The men's long jump event  at the 1998 European Athletics Indoor Championships was held on 27–28 February.

Medalists

Results

Qualification
Qualification performance: 7.80 (Q) or at least 12 best performers (q) advanced to the final.

Final

References

Qualification results
Final results

Long jump at the European Athletics Indoor Championships
Long